Since the 1960s, the Missouri Arts Council has helped bring the arts to all the people of the state. By providing grants to large and small communities, public and private schools, and artists and arts programs, the Missouri Arts Council makes quality arts programming possible. Beneficiaries range from small local arts councils, such as the Shelbina Arts Council and The Pleiades Journal from The University of Central Missouri, to internationally renowned organizations, such as the Saint Louis Symphony.

The Missouri Arts Council is a division of the Office of the Lieutenant Governor. The Council is funded through the Missouri General Assembly, Missouri Cultural Trust, and National Endowment for the Arts.

External links
Official website
Publications by or about the Missouri Arts Council at Internet Archive.

References

Organizations based in Missouri